The Arion Lightning is a light-sport aircraft available as a kit aircraft or as a production Special LSA.

Design and development
The Lightning was developed by designers Pete Krotje, Ben Krotje and Nick Otterback.

Originally designed as a high speed, low wing composite aircraft for the Jabiru series of engines, the LS-1 was redesigned to meet American light-sport requirements by extending the wings to lower the stall speed and using a fixed pitch propeller.

The aircraft is made from composites. Construction time from the supplied kit is 600 hours.

Operational history
In 2007 Earl Ferguson set a record for the quickest time for a flight from Savannah to San Diego in a piston engine land plane weighing between 1,102 and 2,205 pounds using this aircraft.

Variants
Arion Lightning EXP
US Experimental amateur-built category aircraft
Arion Lightning XS
Variant of Lightning EXP supporting up to 160 hp engines, including the Lycoming O-320 and ULPower 390iS.
Arion Lightning LS-1
Light-sport aircraft variant with a choice of engines: the  Jabiru 3300, the  Lycoming O-320 or the  Lycoming IO-390.

Specifications (Arion Lightning LS-1)

See also

References

External links

Homebuilt aircraft
Low-wing aircraft
Single-engined tractor aircraft
Aircraft first flown in 2006